Gyascutus is a genus of beetles in the family Buprestidae, containing the following species:

 Gyascutus allenrolfeae (Verity, 1978)
 Gyascutus caelatus (LeConte, 1858)
 Gyascutus carolinensis Horn, 1883
 Gyascutus castaneus (Helfer, 1953)
 Gyascutus dianae (Helfer, 1954)
 Gyascutus fulgidus (Barr, 1969)
 Gyascutus granulatus (Van Dyke, 1942)
 Gyascutus insularis (Helfer, 1953)
 Gyascutus jeanae (Nelson, 1988)
 Gyascutus pacificus (Chamberlin, 1938)
 Gyascutus paragranulatus Nelson, 2000
 Gyascutus planicosta (LeConte, 1858)
 Gyascutus westcotti Nelson, 2000

References

Buprestidae genera